Cram Racing Enterprises (formerly in partnership with Long Motorsports) is an American professional stock car racing team that competes in the NASCAR Xfinity Series, NASCAR Camping World Truck Series, and ARCA Menards Series. In the NASCAR Xfinity Series they field the No. 35 Ford Mustang part-time for Dawson Cram, in the NASCAR Camping World Truck Series they field the No. 41 Chevrolet Silverado part-time for Dawson Cram, and in the ARCA Menards Series they field the No. 94 Toyota Camry part-time for Bryce Haugeberg.

History

Team History
The team has existed since the start of Cram’s racing career in 2007 and has fielded his cars in Dwarf Cars, Bandolero’s, Legend Car’s, Pro Truck’s, and Late Model Stock Car’s in addition to his racing in the National Touring Series of the NASCAR Xfinity Series, NASCAR Camping World Truck Series, and ARCA Menards Series.

ARCA Menards Series

2020
In a partnership with Fast Track Racing, Cram Racing Enterprises would make their debut in the ARCA Menards Series West in the 2020 season-finale at Phoenix with Erickson in the No. 10 Chevrolet and Chris Hacker in the No. 12 Toyota. Hacker joined the team to make one start in 2020.

2021
The team would return to run the 2021 season-opener at Daytona as well as at Talladega with Benny Chastain piloting their No. 94 entry to 20th and 21st place finishes, respectively.

At Charlotte the team tabbed Chris Hacker who was originally supposed to drive at Daytona but was forced to sit out after contracting COVID-19, to drive the car and would end up coming home in 10th, the team and drivers first ever top 10 in the series.

2022
Bryce Haugeberg would attempt the 2022 season-opener with his own team, Haugeberg Racing, with CRE's No. 94 and a partnership with Cram Racing Enterprises. He was also entered in Talladega.

ARCA Menards Series Results

Truck Series

2017
In 2017, then 15-year-old Dawson Cram entered the 2017 Texas Roadhouse 200 driving the No. 11 Chevrolet Silverado but would later lose a motor in practice and would not attempt a race with the team again until 2020.

2020
In 2020, Cram announced he would be returning and competing at Charlotte with Long Motorsports in the No. 55. The team would then go on to attempt five more races that season, but on August 13, 2020, Cram announced that he was immediately parting ways with Long Motorsports, who would announce that they were looking for a driver to replace Cram for the rest of the season (although Cram would end up running one more race for them at Dover). Shortly after that however, Long's plans changed once again, as it was announced on August 25 that Cram and his family had bought Long Motorsports, making it their team, Cram Racing Enterprises. The first race for the team under the new ownership was at Gateway, with Dawson Cram piloting the renumbered No. 41 truck.

The No. 41 would be entered in the remaining 10 races in 2020, and Dawson Cram would drive it 8 of those, earning a best finish of 16th at Martinsville in October. In the two races where Cram was not the driver, Fast Track Racing ARCA Menards Series driver Ryan Huff drove it at his home track of Richmond for his second start in the series, and Cody Erickson would drive at Bristol in his first Truck Series start in five years.

2021
In 2021 Cram tried to attempt the full 23-race schedule but would end up only attempting 16 races making the field 13 of those times with a best finish of 17th at the Daytona Road Course, he would still attempt the full schedule however fielding his Truck for other drivers such as Cody Erickson, Will Rodgers, Keith McGee, and Todd Peck getting a best finish of 10th with Keith McGee at Talladega, the team and drivers first top 10 in the series.

2022
In 2022 the team attempts to do the full season with Dawson Cram in the No. 41 Chevrolet Silverado but has not entered a race yet.

Xfinity Series

2022
On August 29, 2022, Cram was announced to run the No. 35 car for Emerling-Gase Motorsports in a partnership with his own team CRE and sponsorship from Be Water.

References

External links
 Long Motorsports
 
 

NASCAR teams
ARCA Menards Series teams